In the AFL Women's (AFLW), the North Melbourne best and fairest award is awarded to the best and fairest player at the North Melbourne Football Club during the home-and-away season. The award has been awarded annually since the club's inaugural season in the competition in 2019, and Jenna Bruton was the inaugural winner of the award.

Recipients

See also

 Syd Barker Medal (list of North Melbourne Football Club best and fairest winners in the Australian Football League)

References

AFL Women's awards
Lists of AFL Women's players
North Melbourne Football Club (AFLW) players
Awards established in 2019